StarCraft is a real-time strategy video game franchise by Blizzard Entertainment.

Starcraft or StarCraft may also refer to:

Entertainment
 StarCraft (WildStorm comics), a comic book series based on the video game
 StarCraft (video game), the debut game in the video game series

Transport
 Starship or starcraft, a theoretical spacecraft designed for traveling between planetary systems
 Starcraft (horse), an Australian racehorse 
 Starcraft Bus, a division of Forest River that manufactures buses

See also
 Astrology, a pseudoscience